The Ulhas River is a river in Maharashtra, India. It is in the Thane, Raigad, and Pune districts of that state. It flows north and west from it source to where it splits into Vasai Creek and Thane Creek, near Thane. The Ulhas divides Salsette Island from the mainland, and is important for the water supply of Mumbai.

Gallery

See also

List of rivers of India
Rivers of India
Seven Islands of Bombay

References 

Rivers of Maharashtra
Geography of Thane district
Geography of Raigad district
Palghar district
Rivers of India